The inauguration of William Ruto as the 5th President of Kenya was held on 13 September 2022. Ruto won a tightly contested election in the 2022 Kenyan general election against his long time opponent Raila Odinga. After the court upheld the election results, Tuesday, 13 September 2022 was declared a public holiday and a day set for the inauguration. The venue for the inauguration was the Moi International Sports Centre in Kasarani, Nairobi. Attendance was very high, with many crowds getting into fights with security officials to be able to enter the stadium, however, the event continued peacefully.

Dignitaries

References 

September 2022 events in Africa